Nayel Rayan Mehssatou Sepúlveda (born 8 August 2002) is a professional footballer who plays as a right-back for Kortrijk. Born in Belgium, he represents the Chile national team.

Career
Mehssatou is a youth product of Toekomst Relegem and Anderlecht, having stayed in Anderlecht's youth academy for 13 years. He signed his first professional contract with Anderlecht on 18 December 2019. On 18 January 2022, he transferred to Kortrijk signing a 3.5 year contract. He made his professional debut with Kortrijk in a 3–2 Belgian First Division A loss to Union Saint-Gilloise on 5 March 2022.

International career
He represented the Chile U17s for a pair of friendlies in October 2019. He then switched to represent Belgium U18s that same year, with 1 goal in 4 appearances.

Mehssatou was called up to the senior Chile national team for a friendly and the 2022 Kirin Cup Soccer tournament in June 2022. He debuted with Chile in a friendly 2–0 loss to South Korea on 6 June 2022.

Personal life
Mehssatou was born in Belgium to a Moroccan father and a Chilean mother. His mother, Michelle Sepúlveda, was born in Santiago and moved to Brussels in 1975 along with her Chilean family.

He has an older brother called Yassine Elías.

References

External links
 
 
 Pro League Profile

2002 births
Living people
Footballers from Brussels
Citizens of Chile through descent
Chilean footballers
Chile international footballers
Chile youth international footballers
Belgian footballers
Belgium youth international footballers
Moroccan people of Chilean descent
Chilean people of Moroccan descent
Sportspeople of Moroccan descent
Belgian sportspeople of Moroccan descent
Belgian people of Chilean descent
Sportspeople of Chilean descent
Naturalized citizens of Chile
Association football fullbacks
K.V. Kortrijk players
Belgian Pro League players